Still Feels Good is the fifth studio album by American country music group Rascal Flatts. It was released September 25, 2007, via Lyric Street Records. The album sold 2,192,000 copies in the United States up to May 2009 and was certified 2× Platinum by the RIAA.

Target stores released a bonus five-track CD along with Still Feels Good which includes four songs written by the group as well as a remix of their 2006 single "My Wish".

The album produced five singles on the U.S. Billboard Hot Country Songs charts. The first single, "Take Me There", was co-written by Kenny Chesney and reached No. 1 on the country charts in late 2007. The second and third singles, "Winner at a Losing Game" and "Every Day", both peaked at No. 2. "Bob That Head", the album's fourth single, made the Top 20 at No. 15. The fifth and final single, "Here", also reached No. 1.

Track listing

Personnel 
As listed in liner notes.

Rascal Flatts
 Jay DeMarcus – bass guitar, backing vocals, acoustic piano on "Better Now"
 Gary LeVox – lead vocals
 Joe Don Rooney – electric guitar, acoustic guitar, backing vocals

Additional musicians
 Tony Harrell – keyboards
 Charlie Judge – acoustic piano, keyboards, synthesizers, synth strings, organ, programming, lap steel guitar, drum loops, percussion
 Gordon Mote – acoustic piano, keyboards
 Tom Bukovac – electric guitar
 Dann Huff – electric guitar, acoustic guitar, 12-string guitar, mandolin, banjo, bouzouki
 Bruce Bouton – steel guitar
 Dan Dugmore – steel guitar
 Paul Franklin – steel guitar
 Jonathan Yudkin – fiddle, mandolin, banjo
 Chris McHugh – drums
 Eric Darken – percussion
 Jamie Foxx – lead vocals (11)

String section on "Every Day"
 String arrangement written and conducted by David Campbell
 Larry Corbett, Suzie Katayama and  Timothy Landauer – cello
 Oscar Hidalgo – double bass 
 Roland Kato – viola
 Charlie Bisharat, Larry Greenfield, Alan Grunfeld, Julian Hallmark, Natalie Leggett, Alyssa Park, Vladimir Poliatidi, Michele Richards, Philip Vaiman, Josefina Vergara, John Wittenberg and Ken Yerke – violin

Production 
 Dann Huff – producer 
 Rascal Flatts – producers
 Kirk Boyer – A&R 
 Doug Howard – A&R
 Darrell Franklin – A&R coordinator
 Mark Hagen – recording, overdub recording 
 Steve Marcantonio – recording 
 Justin Niebank – recording, mixing
 Allen Sides – recording
 Drew Bollman – recording assistant, mix assistant 
 John Netti – recording assistant
 Charlie Paakkari – recording assistant, digital editing
 Leslie Richter – recording assistant
 Nathan Yarborough – recording assistant
 Greg Lawrence – mix assistant 
 Christopher Rowe – digital editing 
 Adam Ayan – mastering 
 Mike "Frog" Griffith – production coordinator 
 Sherri Halford – art direction 
 Ashley Heron – art direction 
 Glenn Sweitzer – art direction, package design 
 Chapman Baehler – photography
 John Murphy – wardrobe 
 Melissa Schleicher – hair, makeup

Critical reception
{{Album ratings
| rev1 = Allmusic
| rev1Score = 
| rev2 = Billboard| rev2Score = favorable
| rev3 = Entertainment Weekly| rev3Score = C
| rev4 = People| rev4Score = 
| rev5 = Rolling Stone| rev5Score = 
}}
Critical response was mixed for the album. Giving the album three out of four stars, People magazine said "these boys know how to give today's country-pop fans what they want."  Rolling Stone said "These Buffett-style party boys know what makes them the biggest group alive: songs about trucks and songs about girls," and gave the album three out of five stars. Stephen Thomas Erlewine of Allmusic, who also gave the album a three-out-of-five rating, said "Everything on Still Feels Good sounds fine[…]but few songs stand out and grab attention".Entertainment Weekly critic Ken Tucker gave the album a C rating, saying "this is emo-country arena rock with a (slight) twang[…]the music of Still Feels Good presents not beautiful losers but manipulative wimps." A positive review came from Ken Tucker of Billboard, who wrote that the band "takes some convincing new detours". His review highlighted "Winner at a Losing Game", "She Goes All the Way", "Bob That Head" and "It's Not Supposed to Go Like That" as sounding different from previous Rascal Flatts songs.

Chart performance

Album
The album sold 547,000 copies in its first week of release, topping both the U.S. Country Album chart and the Billboard 200. It is their third consecutive album to hit number one in the U.S. After one week at number one, it fell to number two with about 168,000 copies sold. Still Feels Good sold 2,192,000 copies in the United States up to May 2009 was certified 2× Platinum by the RIAA.

Weekly charts

Year-end charts

SinglesStill Feels Good produced five singles on the US Billboard Hot Country Songs charts. The first single, "Take Me There" (which was co-written by Kenny Chesney, who had originally planned to record it himself) spent three weeks at number one. Shortly after the album's release, the bonus track "Revolution" (a cover of a Beatles song) reached number 57 based on unsolicited airplay. Following "Take Me There" was "Winner at a Losing Game", the first single of Rascal Flatts' career to be written exclusively by the group's three members. Both it and the third single, "Every Day", reached number 2. "Bob That Head", the fourth single, was also the first group's first single to miss the Top 10 after peaking at number 15. "Here" followed in September 2008 and became their ninth number one hit in January 2009.

Certifications

Legal case
In August 2008, veteran New York, New York songwriter D.L. Byron sued Rascal Flatts, their producers, and the Disney Music Group for copyright infringement, arguing that "No Reins" took from his song "Shadows of the Night", written for Pat Benatar in 1982. Byron told The New York Post'' that "[i]t's just too much, too strikingly similar... They'd have to have a tremendous lapse of memory not to realize what they were doing. It's my contention there's willful infringement." Lawyers for band member Joe Don Rooney have responded, "To the extent that 'No Reins' shares any similarities with the plaintiff's alleged copyrighted work, any such similarities between the two works are the result of coincidence and/or the use of common or trite ideas". New York University Law School professor and intellectual property expert Rochelle Dreyfuss has remarked that "[t]hey certainly sound alike" and compared to situation to The Chiffons' famously successful case against George Harrison.

References

2007 albums
Rascal Flatts albums
Lyric Street Records albums
Albums produced by Dann Huff